Saint-Romain-de-Colbosc is a commune in the Seine-Maritime department in the Normandy region in northern France.

Geography

Population

Places of interest

 The eighteenth-century church
 Ruins of the chateau of Robert.
 The chateau of Grosmesnil.
 A fifteenth-century manorhouse.
 The Franco-Prussian War memorial.
 A sixteenth-century stone cross.
 The fifteenth-century porch of the old hospital.
 A Protestant church, dating from the nineteenth century.

See also
Tramway de Saint-Romain-de-Colbosc
Communes of the Seine-Maritime department

References

External links

 Official website of Saint-Romain-de-Colbosc 

Communes of Seine-Maritime